Manchester is a city in Northwest England.  The M23 postcode area of the city includes parts of the suburbs of Wythenshawe and Northenden.  The postcode area contains eleven listed buildings that are recorded in the National Heritage List for England.  Of these, one is listed at Grade I, the highest of the three grades, two are at Grade II*, the middle grade, and the others are at Grade II, the lowest grade.  The area is almost completely residential, and the listed buildings include two former manor houses and associated structures, a former farm and outbuildings, a house, a church, and a vicarage.

Key

Buildings

Notes and references

Notes

Citations

Sources

Lists of listed buildings in Greater Manchester
Buildings and structures in Manchester